The 2013 Scottish Women's Premier League Cup was the 12th edition of the SWPL Cup competition, which began in 2002. The competition was to be contested by all 12 teams of the Scottish Women's Premier League (SWPL

First round 
The match between Buchan and Rangers was declared null and void with Buchan being awarded a 3-0 victory.

Quarter-finals

Semi-finals

Final

External links
at soccerway.com
at Scottish Football Historical Results Archive

References

1
Scot
Scot
Scottish Women's Premier League seasons